In mathematics, in the realm of group theory, a group is said to be a CA-group or centralizer abelian group if the centralizer of any nonidentity element is an abelian subgroup.  Finite CA-groups are of historical importance as an early example of the type of classifications that would be used in the Feit–Thompson theorem and the classification of finite simple groups.  Several important infinite groups are CA-groups, such as free groups, Tarski monsters, and some Burnside groups, and the locally finite CA-groups have been classified explicitly.  CA-groups are also called commutative-transitive groups (or CT-groups for short) because commutativity is a transitive relation amongst the non-identity elements of a group if and only if the group is a CA-group.

History
Locally finite CA-groups were classified by several mathematicians from 1925 to 1998. Then in the Brauer–Suzuki–Wall theorem , finite CA-groups of even order were shown to be Frobenius groups, abelian groups, or two dimensional projective special linear groups over a finite field of even order, PSL(2, 2f) for f ≥ 2.

CA-groups were important in the context of the classification of finite simple groups. Michio Suzuki showed that every finite, simple, non-abelian, CA-group is of even order. This result was first extended to the Feit–Hall–Thompson theorem showing that finite, simple, non-abelian, CN-groups had even order, and then to the Feit–Thompson theorem which states that every finite, simple, non-abelian group is of even order. Wu also extended the classification of Suzuki et al. to locally finite groups.

Examples
Every abelian group is a CA-group, and a group with a non-trivial center is a CA-group if and only if it is abelian. The finite CA-groups are classified: the solvable ones are semidirect products of abelian groups by cyclic groups such that every non-trivial element acts fixed-point-freely and include groups such as the dihedral groups of order 4k+2, and the alternating group on 4 points of order 12, while the nonsolvable ones are all simple and are the 2-dimensional projective special linear groups PSL(2, 2n) for n ≥ 2. Infinite CA-groups include free groups, PSL(2, R), and Burnside groups of large prime exponent, . Wu also observes that Tarski monsters are obvious examples of infinite simple CA-groups.

Works cited

Properties of groups